John Sinclair Cutcliffe (August 22, 1930 – November 10, 2007) was a Canadian politician, who served in the Legislative Assembly of Prince Edward Island from 1966 to 1972. A member of the Liberal Party, he was the assemblyman for the district of 2nd Queens.

Born and raised in Summerside, Prince Edward Island, he first worked for his father's Cutcliffe Funeral Home and eventually became owner of the business. He also served as president of the provincial Red Cross, as a chief of rescue with the Prince Edward Island Emergency Measures Organization, and as a president of the International Rescue and First Aid Association.

He was first elected to the legislature in the 1966 provincial election, serving as a backbench MLA. Reelected in the 1970 provincial election, in his second term he served as deputy speaker of the legislature. He resigned his provincial seat in 1972 to run as a Liberal Party of Canada candidate for Malpeque in the 1972 federal election, but lost to Angus MacLean.

He died on November 10, 2007 at the Queen Elizabeth Hospital in Charlottetown.

References

1930 births
2007 deaths
Prince Edward Island Liberal Party MLAs
People from Summerside, Prince Edward Island
Prince Edward Island candidates for Member of Parliament
Candidates in the 1972 Canadian federal election
Liberal Party of Canada candidates for the Canadian House of Commons